Premiere is an American television anthology series that aired on CBS from July 1, 1968, to September 9, 1968. The presentations were pilots that were not brought by any of the networks.

Among them were "Lassiter", starring Burt Reynolds, "Crisis", starring Carl Betz and Susan Strasberg, and "Higher and Higher", starring Sally Kellerman and John McMartin. Also seen was "Call to Danger", which was made years earlier as the pilot to ''Mission: Impossible.

Lassiter
Lassiter was to be a one-hour show starring Burt Reynolds as a magazine journalist who goes undercover for his stories. It was made by Filmways and was created and produced by Richard Alan Simmons. Sam Wanamaker directed the pilot in November 1966 in Reno, Nevada.

Cast
Burt Reynolds as Lassiter
Sharon Farrell

References

1968 American television series debuts
1968 American television series endings
CBS original programming
1960s American anthology television series